Weybourne Town Pit is a  geological Site of Special Scientific Interest west of Sheringham in Norfolk. It is a Geological Conservation Review site and it is in the Norfolk Coast Area of Outstanding Natural Beauty.

This is the Type locality for the Pleistocene 'Marly Drift'. This is a chalk-rich glacial till thought to have been deposited during the Anglian stage around 450,000 years ago, but its relationship to other deposits in the area is disputed.

There is access to the site from Sheringham Road.

References

Sites of Special Scientific Interest in Norfolk
Geological Conservation Review sites